The 2012–13 San Jose State Spartans men's basketball team representsed San Jose State University during the 2012–13 NCAA Division I men's basketball season. The Spartans, led by eighth year head coach George Nessman, played their home games at the Event Center Arena and were members of the Western Athletic Conference. They finished the season 9–20, 3–14 in WAC play to finish in a tie for eighth place. They lost in the first round of the WAC tournament to UTSA.

This was their last season as a member of the WAC. San Jose State joined the Mountain West Conference in July 2013. San Jose State fired Nessman on March 13, the day after the final game.

Preseason roster changes

Departures

Incoming transfers

Recruits

Roster

Suspensions
James Kinney, the team's leading scorer, was suspended twice in the season for violating team rules: once for the December 22, 2012 game against James Madison and again beginning with the January 11, 2013 game against Utah State. On February 8, coach Nessman confirmed that Kinney's suspension would continue until the end of the season; the San Jose Mercury News reported that the suspension "is believed to be related to academics." After Kinney's second suspension, San Jose State's scoring average went down 15 points to 49.8, and the team never won a game for the rest of the season.

Starting forward Louis Garrett was also indefinitely suspended on January 11 for a violation of team rules but was reinstated on January 24.

Two more players were suspended after Kinney. Chris Jones was suspended beginning February 28, and Alex Brown was suspended beginning March 2. Jones was suspended after San Jose State student newspaper The Spartan Daily published a comment of his saying that Nessman "should have been fired a long time ago."

Schedule

|-
!colspan=9| Exhibition
  
|-
!colspan=9| Regular season

|-
!colspan=9| WAC tournament

March 7's game vs UTSA was canceled due to a leak in the roof at The Events Center Arena. The game was not made up.

References

External links
2012-13 San Jose State men's basketball media guide

San Jose State Spartans men's basketball seasons
San Jose State
San Jose State Spartans men's basketball team
San Jose State Spartans men's basketball team